This list consists of college football players who forfeited remaining collegiate eligibility and were declared by the National Football League to be eligible to be selected in the 2019 NFL Draft. This includes juniors and redshirt sophomores who completed high school at least three years prior to the draft. A player that meets these requirements can renounce his remaining NCAA eligibility and enter the draft. Players had until January 14, 2019 to declare their intention to forgo their collegiate eligibility.

Terminology

Declared Players
The following players had 2019 draft eligibility granted, or confirmed, by the NFL.

References

2019 NFL draft early entrants
2019 National Football League season